Riverview Dam is a lowhead dam on the Chattahoochee River.  The dam was built in 1918 to provide power for Riverview Textile Mill.  The dam is currently owned by Georgia Power.

Georgia Power has applied for permission to remove Riverview Dam in 2023.

References 

https://www.wrbl.com/news/local-news/georgia-power-readies-to-remove-langdale-riverview-and-crow-hop-dams-along-chattahoochee/1670907960

DRiverview
Buildings and structures in Chambers County, Alabama
Dams in Alabama
Dams in Georgia (U.S. state)
Buildings and structures in Harris County, Georgia
Georgia Power dams
Dams completed in 1918
1918 establishments in Alabama
1918 establishments in Georgia (U.S. state)